Koujalgi  is a village in the southern state of Karnataka, India. It is located in the Gokak taluk of Belagavi district in Karnataka.

Demographics
 India census, Koujalgi had a population of 9227 with 4729 males and 4498 females.

See also
 Belgaum
 Districts of Karnataka

References

External links
 http://Belgaum.nic.in/

Villages in Belagavi district